This is a list of the suburbs of Adelaide, the capital city of South Australia, with their postcodes and local government areas (LGAs). This article does not include suburbs and localities within the Adelaide Hills region.

Adelaide's most expensive properties, in terms of sales prices, are mainly located in the inner northern, eastern and southern suburbs, largely because of their proximity to the city centre and private schools, and the array of historic homes within them.

See also

 Local government areas of South Australia
 List of Adelaide railway stations
 List of Adelaide obsolete suburb names
 List of historic houses in South Australia
List of Adelaide parks and gardens

References

Adelaide